The Himachal Pradesh Football Association (abbreviated HPFA) is one of the 37 Indian state football associations that are affiliated to the All India Football Federation.

Background 
Himachal Pradesh Football Association (HPFA) is the governing body for football in the state of Himachal Pradesh.

Competitions

Himachal Football League

References

External links
 Official page at AIFF

Football governing bodies in India
Football in Himachal Pradesh